Montgomery Mall can refer to the following:

Montgomery Mall (Alabama) in Montgomery, Alabama
Montgomery Mall (Pennsylvania) in North Wales, Pennsylvania
The former name of Westfield Montgomery in Montgomery County, Maryland